In mathematics, in particular in topology, the de Groot dual (after Johannes de Groot) of a topology τ on a set X is the topology τ* whose closed sets are generated by compact saturated subsets of (X, τ).

References 
 R. Kopperman (1995), Asymmetry and duality in topology. Topology Applications, 66(1), 1–39, 1995.

Topology